Tomáš Divíšek (born July 19, 1979) is a Czech former professional ice hockey right winger. He played five games in the National Hockey League (NHL) for the Philadelphia Flyers over parts of two seasons.

Career statistics

References

External links

 

1979 births
BK Mladá Boleslav players
Czech ice hockey right wingers
EHC Basel players
HC Davos players
HC Dynamo Pardubice players
HC Kometa Brno players
HC Most players
HC Plzeň players
HC Slavia Praha players
HC Sparta Praha players
LHK Jestřábi Prostějov players
Living people
Piráti Chomutov players
Sportspeople from Most (city)
Philadelphia Flyers draft picks
Philadelphia Flyers players
Philadelphia Phantoms players
Springfield Falcons players
Stadion Hradec Králové players
1. EV Weiden players
Czech expatriate ice hockey players in the United States
Czech expatriate ice hockey players in Germany
Czech expatriate ice hockey players in Switzerland